The Ambassador from New Zealand to the United States is New Zealand's foremost diplomatic representative in the United States of America, and in charge of New Zealand's diplomatic mission in the United States.

The embassy is located in Washington, D.C., the United States' capital city.  New Zealand has maintained a resident ambassador in the United States since 1961, and a resident Head of Mission since 1941.

List of heads of mission
The following individuals have held the office:

References

 New Zealand Heads of Overseas Missions: United States.  New Zealand Ministry of Foreign Affairs and Trade.  Retrieved on 2008-03-29.
Chief of Protocol, 

United States, Ambassadors from New Zealand to
 
New Zealand